Imron Cotan (born 21 December 1954) is an Indonesian diplomat. He was Ambassador of Indonesia to Australia between 2003 and 2005, and Ambassador of Indonesia to China between 2010 and 2013.

Life and career 
Cotan was born on 21 December 1954. He graduated from Gadjah Mada University before joining the Indonesian Department of Foreign Affairs in 1982. After completing the department's course for junior diplomats in 1984, he took on a role promoting international environmental preservation.

In November 2003, Cotan took up a post as Ambassador of Indonesia to Australia. Speaking about on his time in Australia at the end of the posting in 2005, Cotan reflected that the relationship was difficult when he first came to Canberra in 2003 because of events that happened in East Timor in 1999. Cotan said the aid and relief Australia's military had provided to Indonesia in the wake of the 2004 Indian Ocean earthquake and tsunami had brought the two countries closer. He said however that he was stunned at the way Australians reacted to the arrest and sentencing of Schapelle Corby for drug smuggling in 2004–05—some Australians wanted the country's tsunami aid taken into account in Corby's sentencing.

Cotan was appointed Ambassador of Indonesia to China in 2010. In an interview in 2011, Cotan said he was proud to see the relationship between the two countries reach its highest point ever. While he was ambassador, the Indonesian Government opened a consulate general in Shanghai, which was expected to enhance the ties between the two nations.

References 

Living people
1954 births
Ambassadors of Indonesia to Australia
Ambassadors of Indonesia to China